The Cocopah Indian Reservation is the reservation of the federally recognized Cocopah Indian Tribe (Cocopah: Xawiłł Kwñchawaay), which represents Cocopah peoples in the United States. As of the 2000 census a resident population of 1,025 persons, of whom 519 were solely of Native American heritage, lived on the  Cocopah Indian Reservation, which is composed of three non-contiguous sections in Yuma County, Arizona, lying northwest, southwest and south of the city of Yuma, Arizona. The larger section, bordering the Colorado River, lies west of the Yuma suburb of Somerton, while the other section lies just east of Somerton.

There is a casino and bingo hall on the reservation. Another Yuman group, the Quechan, lives in the adjacent Fort Yuma Indian Reservation.

Notes

External links
 Cocopah Indian Tribe, official website

Native American tribes in Arizona
Federally recognized tribes in the United States
American Indian reservations in Arizona
Geography of Yuma County, Arizona